Greece competed at the 1980 Summer Olympics in Moscow, USSR. Greek athletes have competed in every Summer Olympic Games. Of the four nations that have been to every Summer Games (the others being Australia, Great Britain, and Switzerland), Greece was the only one to compete under its national flag at Moscow, as the other three and several other nations competed under the Olympic flag (New Zealand flew the flag of the New Zealand Olympic and Commonwealth Games Association) in protest of the USSR's involvement in the Afghan Civil War.

Medalists

Gold
 Stelios Mygiakis – Wrestling, Men's Greco-Roman Featherweight

Bronze
 Georgios Khatziioannidis – Wrestling, Men's freestyle Featherweight
 Tasos Boudouris, Tasos Gavrilis and Aristidis Rapanakis – Sailing, Men's Soling Team Competition

Results by event

Athletics
Men's 100 metres
 Lambros Kefalas
 Heat – 10.70
 Quarterfinals – 10.62 (→ did not advance)

Men's 200 metres
 Nikolaos Angelopoulos
 Heat – 21.98 (→ did not advance)

Men's Marathon
 Michael Koussis
 Final – 2:18:02 (→ 20th place)

Men's 20 km Walk
 Aristidis Karageorgos
 Final – 1:36:53.4 (→ 15th place)

Men's 50 km Walk
 Aristidis Karageorgos
 Final – 4:24:36 (→ 12th place)

Men's Long Jump
 Dimitrios Delifotis
 Qualification – 7.74 m (→ did not advance)

Women's Long Jump
 Maroula Lambrou
 Qualifying Round – 6.37 m (→ did not advance, 15th place)

Women's Javelin Throw
 Sofia Sakorafa
 Qualification – no mark (→ did not advance)

Water polo

Men's Team Competition
 Preliminary Round (Group A)
 Lost to Netherlands (7–8)
 Lost to Romania (4–6)
 Lost to Hungary (5–8)
 Final Round (Group B)
 Defeated Sweden (9–5)
 Defeated Bulgaria (6–4)
 Lost to Australia (2–4)
 Lost to Italy (3–4)
 Lost to Romania (8–11) → 10th place
 Team Roster
 Ioannis Vossos
 Thomas Karalogos
 Sotirios Stathakis
 Spyros Kapralos
 Kiriakos Giannopoulos
 Aris Kefalogiannis
 Ioannis Garifallos
 Andreas Gounas
 Antonios Aronis
 Markellos Sitarenios
 Ioannis Giannouris

Weightlifting
Heavyweight (100–110 kg)
 Dimitrios Zarzavatsidis

Bantamweight (–56 kg)
 Ioannis-Sidiropoulos

Flyweight (–52 kg)
 Ioannis Katsaidonis

Middle Heavyweight (82.5–90 kg)
 Nikos Iliadis

Lightweight (60–67.5 kg)
 Pavlos Lespouridis

Wrestling

Greco-Roman Light-Heavyweight (82–90 kg)
 Georgios Pozidis

Greco-Roman Heavyweight (90–100 kg)
 Georgios Pozidis

Greco-Roman Flyweight (48–52 kg)
 Charalambos Cholidis

Freestyle Featherweight (57–62 kg)
 Georgios Khatziioannidis – Bronze Medal

Greco-Roman Featherweight (57–62 kg)
 Stelios Mygiakis – Gold Medal

Sailing

Triplehanded Keelboat
 Aristidis Rapanakis – Bronze Medal
 Anastasios Gavrilis – Bronze Medal
 Tasos Bountouris – Bronze Medal

Singlehanded Dinghy (Finn Class)
 Ilias Khatzipavlis

Shooting

Mixed Skeet
 Petros Pappas
 Rodolfos Georgios-Alexakos

Mixed 50m Rifle, Prone
 Athanasios Papageorgiou

Rowing

Coxless Pairs
 Georgios Kourkoumbas
 Nikolaos Ioannidis

Single Sculls
 Kostas Kontomanolis

References

 sports-reference
 Official Olympic Reports
 International Olympic Committee results database
 

Nations at the 1980 Summer Olympics
1980 Summer Olympics
Olympics